Ella Kate Tripp  (born 7 November 1976; née Miles) is an English badminton player.

Tripp competed in badminton at the 2004 Summer Olympics in women's doubles with partner Joanne Wright.  They beat Bulgarians in the first round and were defeated by Lotte Bruil and Mia Audina of the Netherlands in the round of 16. On 17 May 2007 she retired from international badminton, in order to spend more time with her nine-month-old son Callum. She will continue to play county badminton for Cheshire.

References
 European results
 
 tournamentsoftware.com

External links
 

1976 births
Living people
Sportspeople from Shrewsbury
English female badminton players
Olympic badminton players of Great Britain
Badminton players at the 2004 Summer Olympics
Commonwealth Games silver medallists for England
Badminton players at the 2006 Commonwealth Games
Commonwealth Games medallists in badminton
Medallists at the 2006 Commonwealth Games